Language is a Virus   may refer to:

 "Language is a Virus", a song by Laurie Anderson
 a concept in the William S. Burroughs novel The Ticket That Exploded and essay collection, The Electronic Revolution, which is quoted in the Anderson song.

See also 
Memetics, Richard Dawkins' theory suggesting that cultural information is transmitted among people in a virus-like fashion